Yovovich is a Slavic surname 'Йовович'. Notable people with the surname include: 

Kiril Yovovich (1905–1976), Bulgarian footballer

See also
Jovovich (disambiguation) - another transliteration

Bulgarian-language surnames
Ukrainian-language surnames